Mount Babel is the highest peak of the René-Levasseur Island, at  above sea-level, which is  above the Manicouagan Reservoir level. It lies within the Louis-Babel Ecological Reserve in Quebec, Canada.

History
The mount is named after Catholic missionary Louis Babel (1829–1912), who is said to have converted Montagnais and Naskapis.

Mount Babel is the central peak of the Manicouagan impact structure and was formed by the rebound of the crust after the impact of a meteor 210 million years ago. The mountain and reservoir are of particular interest to geologists due to the shock metamorphosis it endured.

Biodiversity
Mount Babel is a valuable research ground for biologists. One can find montane and alpine climate zones there, since meteorological conditions become increasingly extreme towards the summit. These conditions create a quick transition from boreal forest to tundra, where there can be found lichen and other arctic life forms that would normally be observed hundreds of kilometres further north.

References 

Mount Babel
Mountains of Quebec under 1000 metres
Mount Babel